Grafton is a city in Worth County, Iowa, United States. The population was 216 in the 2020 census, a decrease of 13.1% from the 290 population in the 2000 census. It is part of the Mason City Micropolitan Statistical Area.

History

Grafton got its start in the year 1878, following construction of the Chicago, Milwaukee and St. Paul Railway through that territory.

Geography
Grafton is located at  (43.329394, -93.070164).

Demographics

2010 census
As of the census of 2010, there were 252 people, 114 households, and 70 families residing in the city. The racial makeup of the city was 98.8% White, 0.4% Asian, and 0.8% from two or more races.

There were 114 households, of which 26.3% had children under the age of 18 living with them, 52.6% were married couples living together, 6.1% had a female householder with no husband present, 2.6% had a male householder with no wife present, and 38.6% were non-families. 34.2% of all households were made up of individuals, and 15.8% had someone living alone who was 65 years of age or older. The average household size was 2.21 and the average family size was 2.84.

The median age in the city was 43.5 years. 22.2% of residents were under the age of 18; 7.2% were between the ages of 18 and 24; 22.3% were from 25 to 44; 29.7% were from 45 to 64; and 18.7% were 65 years of age or older. The gender makeup of the city was 51.2% male and 48.8% female.

2000 census
As of the census of 2000, there were 290 people, 119 households, and 82 families residing in the city. The racial makeup of the city was 98.97% White, 0.34% Asian, and 0.69% from two or more races.

There were 119 households, out of which 35.3% had children under the age of 18 living with them, 52.9% were married couples living together, 8.4% had a female householder with no husband present, and 30.3% were non-families. 27.7% of all households were made up of individuals, and 14.3% had someone living alone who was 65 years of age or older. The average household size was 2.44 and the average family size was 2.92.

In the city, the population was spread out, with 29.3% under the age of 18, 5.5% from 18 to 24, 30.7% from 25 to 44, 14.8% from 45 to 64, and 19.7% who were 65 years of age or older. The median age was 37 years. For every 100 females, there were 108.6 males. For every 100 females age 18 and over, there were 107.1 males.

The median income for a household in the city was $28,594, and the median income for a family was $34,063. Males had a median income of $28,906 versus $22,500 for females. The per capita income for the city was $14,201. About 2.4% of families and 5.8% of the population were below the poverty line, including 8.9% of those under the age of eighteen and 6.2% of those 65 or over.

Education
It is within the St. Ansgar Community School District school district.

References

External links

 
City-Data Comprehensive statistical data and more about Grafton

Cities in Iowa
Cities in Worth County, Iowa
Mason City, Iowa micropolitan area